Breakin' Outta Hell is the fourth studio album by Australian rock band Airbourne. Released on 23 September 2016, the work was published via Spinefarm.

This is the band's last studio album to feature its longtime rhythm guitarist David Roads, who left the band in 2017 to focus on his family business. He is replaced by an ex-Palace of the King guitarist Matt "Harri" Harrison.

Reception

Breakin' Outta Hell received positive reviews from critics. On Metacritic, the album holds a score of 80/100 based on four reviews, indicating "generally favorable reviews".

Track listing

Charts

Usage in media
The Song "It's All for Rock N' Roll" was used for the E3 trailers of the video game Mario + Rabbids Kingdom Battle.
In episode 3 of the fourth Season of the show Cobra Kai, the song "Breakin' Outta Hell" was used during a training montage & when Daniel LaRusso fought a hockey team. "Thunderstruck" by AC/DC was initially supposed to be used, but was replaced due to budget constraints.

References

2016 albums
Airbourne (band) albums
Spinefarm Records albums
Albums produced by Bob Marlette